The FAM Youth Championship is a Maldivian football competition run by The Football Association of Maldives. It is contested between the U19 divisions of clubs.

Past winners

Winners table

2014 Participants

Group 1
 Club Valencia
 Club Eagles
 Mahibadhoo Sports Club
 Victory Sports Club
 Club Green Street
 TC Sports Club

Group 2
 New Radiant Sports Club
 Maziya Sports & Recreation Club
 Vaikaradhoo Football Club
 Veyru Sports Club

Group 3
 BG Sports Club
 Kelaa Naalhi Sports
 Club All Youth Linkage
 Eydhafushi Zuvaanunge Club

References

External links
 
 U21 Youth Championship at Mihaaru Online
 FAM Youth Championship at Mihaaru Online

 
4